John D. Kelly (born March 31, 1944) is a former American football offensive lineman in the National Football League for the Washington Redskins.  He played college football at Florida A&M University and was drafted in the 20th round of the 1966 NFL Draft as the 295th pick by the Washington Redskins.

1944 births
Living people
American football offensive tackles
Florida A&M Rattlers football players
Washington Redskins players
Players of American football from Fort Lauderdale, Florida